Issue One is an American nonpartisan, nonprofit organization that seeks to reduce the role of money in politics. It aims to increase public awareness of what it views as problems within the present campaign finance system, and to reduce the influence of money in politics through enactment of campaign finance reform.

Formation 

Issue One was formed through the merger of two campaign finance reform organizations: Americans for Campaign Reform and Fund for the Republic.

Americans for Campaign Reform
Americans for Campaign Reform (ACR) was a non-partisan 501(c)(3) organization formed in 2003 by John Rauh, with Dan Weeks, and later Barbara Lawton, serving as president and CEO. The Board of Directors was composed of two Democratic senators and two Republican senators. The ACR described itself as: "a bipartisan community of citizens who believe passionately that public funding of federal elections is the single most critical long-term public policy issue our nation faces. What's at stake are nothing less than the health of our democracy, the quality of our leadership, and our government's ability to tackle the serious problems that affect us all: health care, energy policy, education, the environment and the economy." Their primary purpose was to enact public funding of all federal elections; supporting legislation that promoted small donor participation in elections and provided increased public funds for qualified candidate to run competitive races. ACR emphasized that the longstanding limits on the size of contributions imposed by national, state and local legislation were important to encouraging ordinary citizens to participate in the electoral process.

Fund for the Republic
Fund for the Republic (FFR) was a group formed in late 2012 with the goal of removing the influence of big money in American politics. In 2013, Fund for the Republic co-hosted an event with Democracy Alliance in which it pitched 110 donors on investing in a $40 million plan to combat dark money in American politics. Donors to the Fund for the Republic included Democracy Alliance members Jonathan Soros and the William and Flora Hewlett Foundation. That same year, FFR's affiliated (c)(4) announced plans to fund groups working to defeat politicians who oppose campaign finance reform, while supporting groups backing finance reform politicians.

Organization
The group's stated mission is "reducing the influence of money in politics and putting everyday Americans back in control of our democracy."

Issue One's Executive Director is Nick Penniman. The organization's advisory board is chaired by former U.S. Senators Alan Simpson (R-WY), Bill Bradley (D-NJ) and Bob Kerrey (D-NE). The advisory board includes over 40 members, including Charles Fried, Wesley Clark and Doris Kearns Goodwin. Trevor Potter, a former chairman of the Federal Election Commission (FEC), counsel to the presidential campaigns of George H. W. Bush and John McCain, and vocal critic of unlimited corporate spending and dark money in politics, is a senior advisor.

Activities
Issue One's stated mission is "fighting to protect U.S. elections, lessen political polarization, limit the influence of big money over politics, and improve the ability of Congress to solve problems." The organization raises awareness about these issues, advocates for legislation and federal action,  and produces research and analysis related to key issues.

Campaign finance reform
In 2015, Issue One launched the ReFormers Caucus, a bipartisan group of former lawmakers advocating for campaign finance reform. The caucus initially included more than 100 former officeholders, including former Senate Majority Leader Tom Daschle, former Utah governor Jon Huntsman, and former Secretary of Defense Leon Panetta.  By 2019, that number had expanded to more than 200 members. 
 
The ReFormers Caucus has proposed boosting small donations to campaigns, restricting political contributions from lobbyists, increasing transparency and disclosure in political spending, improving enforcement of relevant laws, and overturning Citizens United.

ReFormers Caucus
In 2015, Issue One launched its ReFormers Caucus, a "group of former members of Congress, Cabinet officials and governors from both parties committed to restoring trust in our democratic institutions" which, as of January 2019, had more than 200 members. Members of the ReFormers Caucus include former Secretaries of Defense Chuck Hagel and Leon Panetta, former Homeland Security Secretary Tom Ridge and former Vice President Walter Mondale. The bipartisan co-chairs of the ReFormers Caucus are former Ambassador to India and Indiana Representative Tim Roemer (D) and former Tennessee Representative Zach Wamp (R). 

The ReFormers Caucus has proposed increasing civic participation, passing laws that define and regulate the role of money in federal elections and "boosting small donations to campaigns, finding ways to restrict political contributions from lobbyists and unmasking secret contributions made to tax-exempt groups that are active in politics."

Blueprints for Democracy

In 2015, Issue One joined with the Campaign Legal Center to publish Blueprints for Democracy, a report providing an overview of how campaign finance reforms have been implemented across the country, and recommending best practices for legislators and advocates attempting to enact change in their local communities.

Trump administration

National Public Radio listed Issue One as one of the most active groups in an informal "resistance network" scrutinizing issues involving the Trump administration's ethics and transparency. Specifically, the group has called for more power for the United States Office of Government Ethics.

Council for Responsible Social Media
In October 2022, Issue One launched its Council for Responsible Social Media project to address the mental, civic, and public health impacts of social media in the United States. It is co-chaired by former House Democratic Caucus Leader Dick Gephardt and former Massachusetts Lieutenant Governor Kerry Healey.

See also
Campaign finance reform in the United States
Mayday PAC
Every Voice
American Promise (Organization)
Stamp Stampede

References

External links
 
 How Money Poisons Our Politics - by two ReFormers Caucus members
 Campaign Finance Reform: How to Finish What Stephen Colbert Started by Issue One senior advisor Trevor Potter 

Campaign finance reform in the United States
Non-profit organizations based in the United States
Organizations established in 2014